The 2016 Richmond Kickers season was the club's twenty-fourth season of existence. It is also the Kickers' ninth-consecutive year in the third-tier of American soccer, playing in the United Soccer League for their fifth season.

The Kickers finished the season ranked seventh in the Eastern Conference, and earned a berth into the 2016 USL Playoffs. Richmond lost in their first round match-up to Louisville City.

Non-competitive

Preseason friendlies

Midseason friendlies

Competitive

USL Regular season

Standings

Matches

USL Cup

U.S. Open Cup 

The Kickers entered the U.S. Open Cup with the rest of the USL, in the second round.

Transfers

In

Out

Statistics

First team roster

Goals and assists

Disciplinary record

References 

Richmond Kickers seasons
Richmond Kickers
Richmond Kickers
Richmond Kickers
Kickers